Athis axaqua is a moth in the Castniidae family. It is found from north-central to south-western of Venezuela and might reach south-eastern Colombia.

The length of the forewings is 40–46 mm. The forewings are light brown dorsally with lighter areas that accent a darker wing base and a faint Y-shaped band that extends from the costal
margin, in the sub apical area, but becomes wider again toward to the anal margin. There is a dark, rounded spot on the apex of the discal cell toward the costal margin. Two to three hyaline, rounded spots are found in the sub apical area. The hindwings are brown-orange, but darker toward the base and lighter toward the center and yellowish toward the costal and anal margins.

The larvae feed on Billbergia species.

References

Moths described in 1992
Castniidae